Wanted in Rome is a monthly magazine in English for expatriates in Rome established in 1982.  The magazine covers Rome news stories that may be of interest to English and Italian speaking residents, and tourists as well. The publication also offers classifieds, photos, information on events, museums, churches, galleries, exhibits, fashion, food, and local travel.

Wanted in Rome was founded in 1982 by two expats who identified the need of an aggregation magazine for the English-speaking community. In 1997 it launched its web site.

The same publisher launched Wanted in Milan in 2005, followed by Wanted in Europe in 2006 and Wanted in Africa in 2007.  These last three have no printed version, only websites.

Editors
 Mary Wilsey (1982 to 2015)
 Marco Venturini (2015 to present)

Contributors 
 Edith Schloss
 Cynthia Rockwell
 Judith Harris
 James Walston
 Alexandra Richardson
 Margaret Stenhouse
 Caroline Prosser
 Camilla Van Staaden
 Laura Clarke
 Helene Pizzi
 Geoffrey S Watson
 Gabrielle Bolzoni
 Andy Devane
 Caitlin Frost
 Marco Venturini
Ludovico Maloba

References

External links
 Wanted in Rome official website
 Wanted in Milan official website

1985 establishments in Italy
Local interest magazines
Magazines established in 1985
Magazines published in Rome
Monthly magazines published in Italy
News magazines published in Italy